Richard Duncan Turnbull (born 1960) is a Church of England clergyman. He was the Principal of Wycliffe Hall, Oxford, an Evangelical Anglican theological college which is part of the University of Oxford.  He stepped down in June 2012 following a long-running dispute, becoming Director of the Centre For Enterprise, Markets and Ethics.

Education and career
Turnbull was educated at the University of Reading (BA 1982) and St John's College, Durham (BA first class theology 1992,  PhD 1997). He became a member of the Institute of Chartered Accountants of Scotland in 1985. He also has a Master of Arts degree from the  University of Oxford (2005).

Turnbull was ordained deacon in 1994 and priest in 1995. He served as assistant curate of Christ Church, Portswood (1994–98) and vicar of Chineham (1998-2005).

Turnbull has also been a member of the General Synod of the Church of England (1995-2005), chairman of the Business Committee of the General Synod (2004–05) and chairman of working parties that produced reports on clergy pay and funding a theological education. He was a member of the Archbishops' Council of the Church of England (2003–05) and chairman of the House of Clergy of the Diocesan Synod of the Diocese of Winchester (2000–05).

Turnbull was appointed Principal of Wycliffe Hall, Oxford in 2005.  He taught courses on Anglicanism, Anglican and Evangelical Identity and the Reformation. He is currently undertaking research projects in Evangelical spirituality and the future of Evangelicalism. He was a member of the committee that drafted the document "A Covenant for the Church of England".

In 2007, Turnbull controversially told a conference that 95% of Britons would go to hell unless the message of the gospel was brought to them.

Personal life
Turnbull is married to Caroline and they have four children.

Publications
Anglican and Evangelical? (Continuum, 2007)
'Evangelicalism: the state of scholarship and the question of identity', Anvil 16:2 (1999)
Eschatology and the Social Order: A Historical Perspective (Whitefield Institute Briefings 3:2, March 1998)
'Lord Shaftesbury', in Theologische Realenzyklopadie (1993)
'The emergence of the Protestant Evangelical Tradition', Churchman'' 107 (November 1993)

References

External links
Church House Bookshop review of Anglican and Evangelical?
Anglican Mainstream review of Anglican and Evangelical?
Thinking Anglicans: Richard Turnbull speaks to Reform
Wycliffe Hall, Oxford: Profile on Wycliffe Hall website
List of Turnbull's publications
University of Oxford Annual Review 2004/05: Heads of House
Church of England Evangelical Council: Council Membership

1960 births
Living people
British theologians
Religion academics
20th-century English Anglican priests
21st-century English Anglican priests
Alumni of St John's College, Durham
Principals of Wycliffe Hall, Oxford
Alumni of the University of Reading
Alumni of Cranmer Hall, Durham
People from Basingstoke and Deane
Members of the General Synod of the Church of England